The 4th European Rowing U23 Championships was the 4th edition and was held from 5 to 6 September 2020 at the Sportpark Duisburg in Duisburg, Germany.

Results

Medal summary

Men

Women

References

External links
Official website
Results summary

2020
2020 in German sport
International sports competitions hosted by Germany
2020 in rowing
European Rowing U23